Teti may refer to:

People
 Teti, first king of the Sixth Dynasty of Egypt
 Teti (vizier), ancient Egyptian vizier
 Teti, Son of Minhotep, ancient Egyptian official
 Têti (born 1979), Brazilian footballer

Other
 Teti, Sardinia, comune in Italy